Ali Kamal Etman (6 June 1941 – 18 June 2020) was an Egyptian footballer. He competed in the men's tournament at the 1964 Summer Olympics.

References

External links
 
 

1941 births
2020 deaths
Egyptian footballers
Egypt international footballers
Olympic footballers of Egypt
Footballers at the 1964 Summer Olympics
Place of birth missing
Association football forwards